The following species in the flowering plant genus Valeriana, the valerians, are accepted by Plants of the World Online. The South American genus Fedia was found to be nested within Valeriana.

Valeriana acutiloba 
Valeriana adscendens 
Valeriana aegaea 
Valeriana aequiloba 
Valeriana agrimoniifolia 
Valeriana ajanensis 
Valeriana albiflora 
Valeriana albonervata 
Valeriana alliariifolia 
Valeriana alpestris 
Valeriana altaica 
Valeriana alternifolia 
Valeriana alypifolia 
Valeriana amarella 
Valeriana amazonum 
Valeriana amurensis 
Valeriana angustifolia 
Valeriana aphanoptera 
Valeriana apiifolia 
Valeriana apula 
Valeriana arborea 
Valeriana aretiastra 
Valeriana aretioides 
Valeriana arizonica 
Valeriana arkansana 
Valeriana armena 
Valeriana asarifolia 
Valeriana aschersoniana 
Valeriana asplenifolia 
Valeriana asterothrix 
Valeriana atacamensis 
Valeriana × aurigerana 
Valeriana baltana 
Valeriana bambusicaulis 
Valeriana barbareifolia 
Valeriana barbulata 
Valeriana battandieri 
Valeriana beddomei 
Valeriana belonantha 
Valeriana bertiscea 
Valeriana boelckei 
Valeriana boliviana 
Valeriana bolkarica 
Valeriana bornmuelleri 
Valeriana borsinii 
Valeriana brachystemon 
Valeriana bracteata 
Valeriana bracteosa 
Valeriana bractescens 
Valeriana × braunii-blanquetii 
Valeriana bridgesii 
Valeriana briquetiana 
Valeriana bryophila 
Valeriana buxifolia 
Valeriana calcitrapae 
Valeriana californica 
Valeriana calvescens 
Valeriana calycina 
Valeriana candolleana 
Valeriana caparaoensis 
Valeriana capensis 
Valeriana capitata 
Valeriana cardamines 
Valeriana carinata 
Valeriana carnosa 
Valeriana castellanosii 
Valeriana catharinensis 
Valeriana caucasica 
Valeriana celtica 
Valeriana cephalantha 
Valeriana ceratophylla 
Valeriana cernua 
Valeriana cerosifolia 
Valeriana chaerophylloides 
Valeriana chamaedryfolia 
Valeriana chenopodiifolia 
Valeriana chiapensis 
Valeriana chilensis 
Valeriana chionophila 
Valeriana ciliosa 
Valeriana clarionifolia 
Valeriana clarkei 
Valeriana clematitis 
Valeriana coarctata 
Valeriana colchica 
Valeriana coleophylla 
Valeriana columbiana 
Valeriana comosa 
Valeriana condamoana 
Valeriana congesta 
Valeriana connata 
Valeriana convallarioides 
Valeriana cornucopiae 
Valeriana coronata 
Valeriana corymbulosa 
Valeriana corynodes 
Valeriana costata 
Valeriana crassifolia 
Valeriana crassipes 
Valeriana crinii 
Valeriana crispa 
Valeriana cuatrecasasii 
Valeriana cucurbitifolia 
Valeriana cumbemayensis 
Valeriana cyclophylla 
Valeriana daghestanica 
Valeriana daphniflora 
Valeriana davyana 
Valeriana decussata 
Valeriana deltoidea 
Valeriana densa 
Valeriana densiflora 
Valeriana dentata 
Valeriana descolei 
Valeriana dinorrhiza 
Valeriana dioica 
Valeriana dipsacoides 
Valeriana discoidea 
Valeriana domingensis 
Valeriana dorotheae 
Valeriana dubia 
Valeriana echinata 
Valeriana edulis 
Valeriana edwardsensis 
Valeriana effusa 
Valeriana eichleriana 
Valeriana × ekmanii 
Valeriana elongata 
Valeriana emmanuelii 
Valeriana engleriana 
Valeriana erikae 
Valeriana eriocarpa 
Valeriana eriophylla 
Valeriana erotica 
Valeriana eupatoria 
Valeriana excelsa 
Valeriana extincta 
Valeriana fauriei 
Valeriana fedtschenkoi 
Valeriana ferax 
Valeriana ficariifolia 
Valeriana flaccidissima 
Valeriana flagellifera 
Valeriana florifera 
Valeriana fonkii 
Valeriana fragilis 
Valeriana gaimanensis 
Valeriana galeottiana 
Valeriana gallinae 
Valeriana × gesneri 
Valeriana gibbosa 
Valeriana gilgiana 
Valeriana × gillotii 
Valeriana glaziovii 
Valeriana glechomifolia 
Valeriana globiflora 
Valeriana globularioides 
Valeriana globularis 
Valeriana graciliflora 
Valeriana gracilipes 
Valeriana granataea 
Valeriana grandifolia 
Valeriana grisiana 
Valeriana grossheimii 
Valeriana hadros 
Valeriana hardwickei 
Valeriana hebecarpa 
Valeriana hengduanensis 
Valeriana henrici 
Valeriana herrerae 
Valeriana heterocarpa 
Valeriana hiemalis 
Valeriana himachalensis 
Valeriana himalayana 
Valeriana hirsuta 
Valeriana hirtella 
Valeriana hirticalyx 
Valeriana hornschuchiana 
Valeriana hsui 
Valeriana humahuacensis 
Valeriana humboldtii 
Valeriana hunzikeri 
Valeriana hyalinorrhiza 
Valeriana ibika 
Valeriana iganciana 
Valeriana imbricata 
Valeriana inconspicua 
Valeriana insignis 
Valeriana interrupta 
Valeriana isoetifolia 
Valeriana italica 
Valeriana jaeschkei 
Valeriana jasminoides 
Valeriana jatamansi 
Valeriana jelenevskyi 
Valeriana johannae 
Valeriana juncea 
Valeriana kamelinii 
Valeriana karstenii 
Valeriana kassarica 
Valeriana kawakamii 
Valeriana kellereri 
Valeriana kilimandscharica 
Valeriana kotschyi 
Valeriana kurtziana 
Valeriana laciniosa 
Valeriana lanata 
Valeriana lancifolia 
Valeriana langei 
Valeriana lapathifolia 
Valeriana lasiocarpa 
Valeriana laxiflora 
Valeriana laxissima 
Valeriana lecoqii 
Valeriana ledoides 
Valeriana lepidota 
Valeriana leptothyrsos 
Valeriana leschenaultii 
Valeriana leucocarpa 
Valeriana leucophaea 
Valeriana locusta 
Valeriana longiflora 
Valeriana longitubulosa 
Valeriana lyrata 
Valeriana macbridei 
Valeriana macrocera 
Valeriana macropoda 
Valeriana macrorhiza 
Valeriana macrosiphon 
Valeriana maipoana 
Valeriana malvacea 
Valeriana mandoniana 
Valeriana mandonii 
Valeriana mapirensis 
Valeriana maroccana 
Valeriana martini 
Valeriana martjanovii 
Valeriana matheziana 
Valeriana meonantha 
Valeriana merxmuelleri 
Valeriana microphylla 
Valeriana micropterina 
Valeriana minor 
Valeriana minutiflora 
Valeriana montana 
Valeriana moonii 
Valeriana moorei 
Valeriana moyanoi 
Valeriana muelleri 
Valeriana munozii 
Valeriana murrayi 
Valeriana mussooriensis 
Valeriana nahuelbutae 
Valeriana naidae 
Valeriana neglecta 
Valeriana nelsonii 
Valeriana nevadensis 
Valeriana nigricans 
Valeriana niphobia 
Valeriana nivalis 
Valeriana oaxacana 
Valeriana oblongifolia 
Valeriana obtusifolia 
Valeriana obtusiloba 
Valeriana occidentalis 
Valeriana officinalis 
Valeriana olenaea 
Valeriana oligantha 
Valeriana orbiculata 
Valeriana organensis 
Valeriana otomiana 
Valeriana oxyrhyncha 
Valeriana ozarkana 
Valeriana pallescens 
Valeriana palmatiloba 
Valeriana palmeri 
Valeriana paniculata 
Valeriana papilla 
Valeriana pardoana 
Valeriana parvula 
Valeriana pauciflora 
Valeriana paucijuga 
Valeriana paulae 
Valeriana peltata 
Valeriana pennellii 
Valeriana petersenii 
Valeriana petrophila 
Valeriana philippiana 
Valeriana phitosiana 
Valeriana phu 
Valeriana phylicoides 
Valeriana pilosa 
Valeriana pinnatifida 
Valeriana plagiostephana 
Valeriana plectritoides 
Valeriana pleurota 
Valeriana polemonifolia 
Valeriana polybotrya 
Valeriana polyclada 
Valeriana polystachya 
Valeriana pontica 
Valeriana potopensis 
Valeriana pratensis 
Valeriana prionophylla 
Valeriana protenta 
Valeriana psychrophila 
Valeriana pulchella 
Valeriana pulvinata 
Valeriana pumila 
Valeriana punctata 
Valeriana pycnantha 
Valeriana pyramidalis 
Valeriana pyrenaica 
Valeriana pyricarpa 
Valeriana pyrolifolia 
Valeriana quadrangularis 
Valeriana quindiensis 
Valeriana quirorana 
Valeriana radicalis 
Valeriana radicata 
Valeriana reitziana 
Valeriana renifolia 
Valeriana reverdattoana 
Valeriana rhizantha 
Valeriana rigida 
Valeriana rimosa 
Valeriana robertianifolia 
Valeriana rosaliana 
Valeriana rossica 
Valeriana roylei 
Valeriana rubra 
Valeriana rufescens 
Valeriana ruizlealii 
Valeriana rumicoides 
Valeriana rusbyi 
Valeriana rzedowskiorum 
Valeriana salicariifolia 
Valeriana saliunca 
Valeriana samolifolia 
Valeriana saxatilis 
Valeriana saxicola 
Valeriana scandens 
Valeriana schachristanica 
Valeriana sclerocarpa 
Valeriana scouleri 
Valeriana secunda 
Valeriana sedifolia 
Valeriana selerorum 
Valeriana senecioides 
Valeriana serrata 
Valeriana serratifolia 
Valeriana sibthorpii 
Valeriana sichuanica 
Valeriana sieberi 
Valeriana sisymbriifolia 
Valeriana sitchensis 
Valeriana smithii 
Valeriana sobraliana 
Valeriana sorbifolia 
Valeriana spathulata 
Valeriana speluncaria 
Valeriana sphaerocarpa 
Valeriana sphaerocephala 
Valeriana sphaerophora 
Valeriana spicata 
Valeriana spiroflora 
Valeriana stenophylla 
Valeriana stenoptera 
Valeriana stolonifera 
Valeriana stracheyi 
Valeriana stricta 
Valeriana stuckertii 
Valeriana sulcata 
Valeriana supina 
Valeriana szovitsiana 
Valeriana tachirensis 
Valeriana tafiensis 
Valeriana tajuvensis 
Valeriana tanacetifolia 
Valeriana tangutica 
Valeriana tatamana 
Valeriana tessendorffiana 
Valeriana texana 
Valeriana theodorici 
Valeriana tiliifolia 
Valeriana tomentosa 
Valeriana transjenisensis 
Valeriana trichomanes 
Valeriana trichostoma 
Valeriana trinervis 
Valeriana triphylla 
Valeriana triplaris 
Valeriana triplinervis 
Valeriana tripteris 
Valeriana tuberculata 
Valeriana tuberifera 
Valeriana tuberosa 
Valeriana tucumana 
Valeriana tunuyanense 
Valeriana turgida 
Valeriana turkestanica 
Valeriana tzotziliana 
Valeriana ulei 
Valeriana uliginosa 
Valeriana umbilicata 
Valeriana uncinata 
Valeriana urbani 
Valeriana urticifolia 
Valeriana vaga 
Valeriana vaginata 
Valeriana valdiviana 
Valeriana velutina 
Valeriana venezuelana 
Valeriana verrucosa 
Valeriana verticillata 
Valeriana vesicaria 
Valeriana vetasana 
Valeriana vilcabambensis 
Valeriana virescens 
Valeriana virgata 
Valeriana volkensii 
Valeriana wandae 
Valeriana warburgii 
Valeriana weberbaueri 
Valeriana weddelliana 
Valeriana wolgensis 
Valeriana woodsiana 
Valeriana zamoranensis 
Valeriana zapotecana

References

Valeriana